The 2007–08 UCF Knights men's basketball team was an NCAA Division I college basketball team that represented the University of Central Florida and competed in Conference USA. They played their home games at the UCF Arena in Orlando, Florida, and were led by head coach Kirk Speraw who was in his 15th season with the team. In the previous year, the Knights finished the season 22–9, 11–5 in C-USA play.

The 2007–08 season marked the first year that the Knights played in the new UCF Arena. From 1991–2007, the team played in the original UCF Arena, now known as The Venue at UCF.

Roster

Schedule and results

|-
!colspan=8| Exhibition

|-
!colspan=8| Regular season (Non-conference play)
|-

|-
!colspan=8| Regular season (C-USA conference play)
|-

|-
!colspan=8| C-USA tournament
|-

|-
| colspan="8" | *Non-Conference Game. Rankings from AP poll. All times are in Eastern Time.
|}

References

UCF Knights men's basketball seasons
UCF
UCF Knights
UCF Knights